Edgar Laurence "Laurie" Raine (21 May 1925 – 9 January 2011) was an Australian rules footballer who played with Footscray in the Victorian Football League (VFL).

Raine was recruited to Footscray after some impressive performances with Chiltern Football Club in 1945.

Notes

External links 

1925 births
2011 deaths
Australian rules footballers from Victoria (Australia)
Western Bulldogs players
Royal Australian Air Force personnel of World War II
Royal Australian Air Force airmen